Give Me the Reason is the fifth studio album by American R&B/soul singer-songwriter Luther Vandross, released on September 26, 1986 issued by Epic Records. The album earned Vandross an American Music Award for Favorite Soul/R&B Male Artist and a nomination for "Favorite Soul/R&B Album" in 1988, while the title track was nominated for Best R&B Song and Best R&B Vocal Performance, Male at the 29th Grammy Awards.

The album also includes Vandross' first Billboard top-20 pop hit, "Stop to Love." It also marked a svelte, thinner Vandross due to a weight loss earlier in the year. The album went on to sell over 2 million copies in the United States and was certified double platinum by the Recording Industry Association of America (RIAA). In addition to the title track and "Stop to Love," the album features three other hit singles: "So Amazing", "There's Nothing Better Than Love" (duet with Gregory Hines), and "I Really Didn't Meant It."

Track listing

Personnel 
 Luther Vandross – lead and backing vocals, vocal arrangements
 Nat Adderley, Jr. – keyboards, synthesizers, string arrangements, rhythm and synthesizer arrangements (1, 4, 5, 6, 8, 9), horn and string arrangements (4)
 Marcus Miller – synthesizers, bass, rhythm and synthesizer arrangements (2, 3, 7), backing vocals 
 Jason Miles – synthesizer programming
 Paul Jackson, Jr. – guitar (1-6, 8, 9)
 Doc Powell – guitar (1-6, 8, 9)
 Ira Siegel – guitar (7)
 Yogi Horton – drums 
 Paulinho da Costa – congas, percussion 
 Kirk Whalum – saxophone solo (3, 9)
 Paul Riser – horn and string arrangements (4)
 John "Skip Anderson – rhythm arrangements (6)
 David Lasley – backing vocals, vocal contractor 
 Kevin Owens – backing vocals
 Fonzi Thornton – backing vocals, vocal contractor
 Ava Cherry – alto vocals
 Charlotte Crossley – alto vocals
 Michelle Cobbs – alto vocals
 Paulette McWilliams – alto vocals, vocal contractor
 Alfa Anderson – soprano vocals 
 Lisa Fischer – soprano vocals 
 Cissy Houston – soprano vocals 
 Cheryl Lynn – soprano vocals
 Myrna Smith-Schilling – soprano vocals

Production 
 Marcus Miller – producer 
 Luther Vandross – producer
 Larkin Arnold – executive producer
 Ray Bardani – engineer, mixing 
 Greg Calbi – mastering at Sterling Sound (New York, NY).
 Marsha Burns – production coordinator 
 George Corsillo – art direction, design 
 Matthew Rolston – photography
 Shep Gordon – manager
 Daniel S. Markus – manager
 Alive Enterprises, Inc. – management company

Charts and certifications

Weekly charts

Year-end charts

Certifications

References

External links 
 Review from Rolling Stone

1986 albums
Epic Records albums
Legacy Recordings albums
Luther Vandross albums
Albums produced by Luther Vandross
Albums produced by Marcus Miller
Albums recorded at AIR Studios